Third Russian Revolution may refer to one of the following events.
Left-wing uprisings against the Bolsheviks, in the terminology of anarchists
Perestroika (1980s–1990s), a political movement for reformation within the Communist Party of the Soviet Union
Dissolution of the Soviet Union, 1991
October Revolution, 1917